Se Mia Schedia (Greek: Σε Μια Σχεδία; English: On One Raft) is a studio album by Greek artist Glykeria. It was released in 1994 by the WEA Greece and was her last release with the music label.

Track listing 
 "Spaste Ta Potiria Ola" (Break all the glasses) – 3:11
 "Me Leilatises" – 3:32
 "Se Mia Schedia" (In one plan) – 3:56
 "Pros Theou" (For God's sake) – 3:23
 "Den Me Tromazei" (It doesn't scare me) – 4:03
 "Agapi Fotia" (Love of fire) – 3:28
 "Zoi Misi" (Half life) – 3:32
 "Osoi Agapisan" (Whoever has loved) – 3:27
 "San Ximerosi" (As the sun rises) – 3:19
 "Edo Vithos" – 2:55
 "Nihtes Gemates Alkol" (Alcohol filled nights) – 4:00
 "Oneiro Thavma" (Miracle dream) – 4:11
 "Skia Hristougennon" (Christmas shadow) – 3:12
 "To Tragoudi Mou" (My song) – 3:15

Music videos
 "Osoi Agapisane"

1994 albums
Glykeria albums
Greek-language albums